Leandro de Almeida Borges (born 31 March 1985), commonly known as Leandro, is a Brazilian footballer who plays as a midfielder. Until 2013, Leandro was playing for Charleroi in the Belgian Pro League, before being released.

References 

1985 births
Living people
Brazilian footballers
S.C. Beira-Mar players
Joinville Esporte Clube players
Figueirense FC players
Esporte Clube Bahia players
Mirassol Futebol Clube players
R. Charleroi S.C. players
Primeira Liga players
Brazilian expatriate footballers
Expatriate footballers in Portugal
Brazilian expatriate sportspeople in Portugal
Expatriate footballers in Belgium
Brazilian expatriate sportspeople in Belgium
Clube Atlético Joseense players
Association football midfielders
Footballers from São Paulo